In anatomy and zoology, the cortex (plural cortices) is the outermost (or superficial) layer of an organ. Organs with well-defined cortical layers include kidneys, adrenal glands, ovaries, the thymus, and portions of the brain, including the cerebral cortex, the best-known of all cortices.

Etymology
The word is of Latin origin and means bark, rind, shell or husk.

Notable examples 

 The renal cortex, between the renal capsule and the renal medulla; assists in ultrafiltration
 The adrenal cortex, situated along the perimeter of the adrenal gland; mediates the stress response through the production of various hormones
 The thymic cortex, mainly composed of lymphocytes; functions as a site for somatic recombination of T cell receptors, and positive selection
 The cerebral cortex, the outer layer of the cerebrum, plays a key role in memory, attention, perceptual awareness, thought, language, and consciousness. 
 Cortical bone is the hard outer layer of bone; distinct from the spongy, inner cancellous bone tissue
 Ovarian cortex is the outer layer of the ovary and contains the follicles.
 The lymph node cortex is the outer layer of the lymph node.

Cerebral cortex

The cerebral cortex is typically described as comprising three parts: the sensory, motor, and association areas. These sensory areas receive and process information from the senses. The senses of vision, audition, and touch are served by the primary visual cortex, the primary auditory cortex, and primary somatosensory cortex. The cerebellar cortex is the thin gray surface layer of the cerebellum, consisting of an outer molecular layer or stratum moleculare, a single layer of Purkinje cells (the ganglionic layer), and an inner granular layer or stratum granulosum. The cortex is the outer surface of the cerebrum and is composed of gray matter.

The motor areas are located in both hemispheres of the cerebral cortex. Two areas of the cortex are commonly referred to as motor: the primary motor cortex, which executes voluntary movements; and the supplementary motor areas and premotor cortex, which select voluntary movements. In addition, motor functions have been attributed to the posterior parietal cortex, which guides voluntary movements; and the dorsolateral prefrontal cortex, which decides which voluntary movements to make according to higher-order instructions, rules, and self-generated thoughts.

References 

Anatomy